Skuffed Up My Huffy is an album by Japanther. It was released by Menlo Park Recordings in 2007. The album was also released on vinyl by Altin Village & Mine Records. In Canada, the album was released on CD by We Are Busy Bodies.

Track listing 
 "See Evil" – 1:53
 "Summer of 79" – 2:00
 "Mornings" – 1:54
 "Cable Babies" – 2:19
 "Vagabond" – 2:16
 "$100 Cover" – 3:00
 "River Phoenix" – 2:26
 "Challenge" – 2:59
 "Fuk tha Prince a Pull Iz Dum" – 2:50
 "Funeral" – 0:55
 "Tender People" – 1:46
 "The Boss" – 1:26
 untitled – 0:33
 "Boys Don't Cry" – 1:24
 "Cable Babies" (live) – 1:06

References 

Japanther albums
2007 albums